Williams County Courthouse, at the intersection of Main and High Streets in Bryan, is the county courthouse serving Williams County, Ohio. The courthouse was built in the late nineteenth century to replace an earlier courthouse; Bryan had been the Williams County seat since 1840. Architect E.O. Fallis of Toledo designed the courthouse in the Romanesque Revival style, which was nationally popular in the late nineteenth century. The design for the courthouse was approved by the county in 1888, and the building's cornerstone was placed the next year; construction was completed in 1891. The courthouse features a large clock tower at its center and eight turrets on its sides, with a large and a small turret atop each entrance bay.

The courthouse was added to the National Register of Historic Places on May 7, 1973.

References

External links

		
National Register of Historic Places in Williams County, Ohio
Courthouses on the National Register of Historic Places in Ohio
Buildings and structures in Williams County, Ohio
County courthouses in Ohio
Romanesque Revival architecture in Ohio
Government buildings completed in 1890
Bryan, Ohio